Malayalam script (/ ) is a Brahmic script used commonly to write Malayalam, which is the principal language of Kerala, India, spoken by 45 million people in the world. It is a Dravidian language spoken in the Indian state of Kerala and the union territories of Lakshadweep and Puducherry (Mahé district) by the Malayali people. It is one of the official scripts of the Indian Republic. Malayalam script is also widely used for writing Sanskrit texts in Kerala.

The Malayalam script bears high similarity with Tigalari script, which was used for writing the Tulu language, spoken in coastal Karnataka (Dakshina Kannada and Udupi districts) and the northernmost Kasargod district of Kerala. Like many other Indic scripts, it is an alphasyllabary (abugida), a writing system that is partially “alphabetic” and partially syllable-based. The modern Malayalam alphabet has 15 vowel letters, 42 consonant letters, and a few other symbols. The Malayalam script is a Vatteluttu alphabet extended with symbols from the Grantha alphabet to represent Indo-Aryan loanwords.
The script is also used to write several minority languages such as Paniya, Betta Kurumba, and Ravula. The Malayalam language itself was historically written in several different scripts.

History

Malayalam was first written in the Tamil-Brahmi script, an ancient script of Tamil and Malayalam languages. However, the modern Malayalam script evolved from the Grantha alphabet, and Vattezhuthu, both of which evolved from the Tamil-Brahmi, but independently.

Vatteluttu is a script that had evolved from Tamil-Brahmi and was once used extensively in the southern part of present-day Tamil Nadu and in Kerala. The Vazhappally inscription issued by Rajashekhara Varman is the earliest example, dating from about 830 CE. During the medieval period, the Tigalari script that was used for writing Tulu in South Canara, and Sanskrit in the adjacent Malabar region, was very similar to the modern Malayalam script. In the Tamil state, the modern Tamil script had supplanted Vattezhuthu by the 15th century, but in the Malabar region, Vattezhuthu remained in general use up to the 17th century, or the 18th century. A variant form of this script, Kolezhuthu, was used until about the 19th century mainly in the Malabar-Cochin area. Another variant form, Malayanma, was used in the south of Thiruvananthapuram.

According to Arthur Coke Burnell, one form of the Grantha alphabet, originally used in the Chola dynasty, was imported into the southwest coast of India in the 8th or 9th century, which was then modified in course of time in this secluded area, where communication with the east coast was very limited. It later evolved into Tigalari-Malayalam script was used by the Malayali, Havyaka Brahmins and Tulu Brahmin people, but was originally only applied to write Sanskrit. This script split into two scripts: Tigalari and Malayalam. While Malayalam script was extended and modified to write vernacular language Malayalam, the Tigalari was written for Sanskrit only. In Malabar, this writing system was termed Arya-eluttu (Ārya eḻuttŭ), meaning “Arya writing” (Sanskrit is Indo-Aryan language while Malayalam is a Dravidian language).

Vatteluttu was in general use, but was not suitable for literature where many Sanskrit words were used. Like Tamil-Brahmi, it was originally used to write Tamil, and as such, did not have letters for voiced or aspirated consonants used in Sanskrit but not used in Tamil. For this reason, Vatteluttu and the Grantha alphabet were sometimes mixed, as in the Manipravalam. One of the oldest examples of the Manipravalam literature, Vaishikatantram (Vaiśikatantram), dates back to the 12th century, where the earliest form of the Malayalam script was used, which seems to have been systematised to some extent by the first half of the 13th century.

It is Thunchaththu Ezhuthachan who is also credited with the development of Malayalam script into the current form through the intermixing and modification of the erstwhile scripts of Vatteluttu, Kolezhuthu, and Grantha script, which were used to write the inscriptions and literary works of Old and Middle Malayalam. He further eliminated excess and unnecessary letters from the modified script. Hence, Ezhuthachan is also known as The Father of modern Malayalam. The development of modern Malayalam script was also heavily influenced by the Tigalari script, which was used to write the Tulu language, due to the influence of Tuluva Brahmins in Kerala.

Thunchaththu Ezhuthachan, a poet from around the 16th century, used Arya-eluttu to write his Malayalam poems based on Classical Sanskrit literature. For a few letters missing in Arya-eluttu (ḷa, ḻa, ṟa), he used Vatteluttu. His works became unprecedentedly popular to the point that the Malayali people eventually started to call him the father of the Malayalam language, which also popularised Arya-eluttu as a script to write Malayalam. However, Grantha did not have distinctions between e and ē, and between o and ō, as it was as an alphabet to write a Sanskrit language. The Malayalam script as it is today was modified in the middle of the 19th century when Hermann Gundert invented the new vowel signs to distinguish them.

By the 19th century, old scripts like Kolezhuthu had been supplanted by Arya-eluttu – that is the current Malayalam script. Nowadays, it is widely used in the press of the Malayali population in Kerala.

Orthography reform

In 1971, the Government of Kerala reformed the orthography of Malayalam by a government order to the education department. The objective was to simplify the script for print and typewriting technology of that time, by reducing the number of glyphs required. In 1967, the government appointed a committee headed by Sooranad Kunjan Pillai, who was the editor of the Malayalam Lexicon project. It reduced number of glyphs required for Malayalam printing from around 1000 to around 250. Above committee's recommendations were further modified by another committee in 1969.

This proposal was later accepted by major newspapers in January 1971. The reformed script came into effect on 15 April 1971 (the Kerala New Year), by a government order released on 23 March 1971.

Recommendations by the committees

Use non-ligating vowel signs for u, ū, and r̥  
In the traditional orthography, that had been taught in the primary education till that time, any consonant or consonant ligature followed by the vowel sign of u, ū, or r̥ are represented by a cursive consonant-vowel ligature. The glyph of each consonant had its own way of ligating with these vowel signs. This irregularity was simplified in the reformed script. As per that, a vowel sign or the consonant sign would always have a disconnected symbol that does not fuse with the base consonant.

Examples:
 ku: →  
 kū: → 
 kr̥: → 
 nu: → 
 śu: →

Split uncommon conjuncts with Chandrakkala 
Also, most of traditional consonant-consonant ligatures, especially the less common ones only used to write words of Sanskrit origin, were split into non-ligated forms with explicit chandrakkala. For example:
  g +  da = gda: -> 
  l +  ta = lta: -> 
  ś +  na = śna: -> 
  ś +  ma = śma: -> 

 The ligature śma is required as an additional letter. For examples, śmaśanam, is the word for cemetery.

Use non-ligating sign for conjoining ra 
Any consonant or consonant ligature followed by the conjoining ra is represented by a cursive tail attached to the consonant or the consonant-ligature. In the reformed script, this consonant sign would be disconnected from the base and represented as a left-bracket like symbol placed on the left side of the cluster.
 kra: → 
 kru:  →

Current status 
Today the reformed orthography, is commonly called put̪iya lipi and  traditional system, pazhaya lipi. Current print media almost entirely uses reformed orthography. The state run primary education introduces the Malayalam writing to the pupils in reformed script only and the books are printed accordingly. However, the digital media uses both traditional and reformed in almost equal proportions as the fonts for both the orthographies are commonly available.

Description

Characteristics
The basic characters can be classified as follows:
 Vowels (svaram)
 Independent vowel letters
 Dependent vowel signs
 Consonant letters (vyañjanam)

An independent vowel letter is used as the first letter of a word that begins with a vowel. A consonant letter, despite its name, does not represent a pure consonant, but represents a consonant + a short vowel /a/ by default. For example,  is the first consonant letter of the Malayalam alphabet, which represents /ka/, not a simple /k/. A vowel sign is a diacritic attached to a consonant letter to indicate that the consonant is followed by a vowel other than /a/. If the following vowel is /a/, no vowel sign is needed. The phoneme /a/ that follows a consonant by default is called an inherent vowel. To denote a pure consonant sound not followed by a vowel, a special diacritic virama is used to cancel the inherent vowel. The following are examples where a consonant letter is used with or without a diacritic.
  /k/ = /k/ which is a consonant sound
 ka =  /k/ +  vowel sign a
 ki =  /k/ +  vowel sign i
  ku =  /k/ +  vowel sign u
  kai =  /k/ +  vowel sign ai

Malayalam alphabet is unicase, or does not have a case distinction. It is written from left to right, but certain vowel signs are attached to the left (the opposite direction) of a consonant letter that it logically follows. In the word  (Kēraḷam), the vowel sign  (ē) visually appears in the leftmost position, though the vowel ē logically follows the consonant k.

Malayalam letters

Vowels

Vowel letters and vowel signs
The following tables show the independent vowel letters and the corresponding dependent vowel signs (diacritics) of the Malayalam script, with romanizations in ISO 15919, transcriptions in the International Phonetic Alphabet (IPA).

r̥, r̥̄, l̥, l̥̄, used to write Sanskrit words, are treated as vowels. They are called semi-vowels and are phonetically closer to vowels in Malayalam and in Classical Sanskrit where Panini, the Sanskrit grammarian, groups them with vowel sounds in his sutras. (see Proto-Indo-European language and Vedic Sanskrit). The letters and signs for r̥̄, l̥, l̥̄ are very rare, and are not considered as part of the modern orthography.

The vowel signs ā, i, ī are placed to the right of a consonant letter to which it is attached. The vowel signs e, ē, ai are placed to the left of a consonant letter. The vowel signs o and ō consist of two parts: the first part goes to the left of a consonant letter and the second part goes to the right of it. In the reformed orthography, the vowel signs u, ū, r̥ are simply placed to the right of the consonant letter, while they often make consonant-vowel ligatures in the traditional orthography.

It is important to note the vowel duration as it can be used to differentiate words that would otherwise be the same. For example,  means "earthenware pot" while  means "time" or "season".

Anusvaram

An anusvaram ( anusvāram), or an anusvara, originally denoted the nasalization where the preceding vowel was changed into a nasalised vowel, and hence is traditionally treated as a kind of vowel sign. In Malayalam, however, it simply represents a consonant  after a vowel, though this  may be assimilated to another nasal consonant. It is a special consonant letter, different from a "normal" consonant letter, in that it is never followed by an inherent vowel or another vowel. In general, an anusvara at the end of a word in an Indian language is transliterated as ṁ in ISO 15919, but a Malayalam anusvara at the end of a word is transliterated as m without a dot.

Visargam

A visargam (visargam), or visarga, represents a consonant  after a vowel, and is transliterated as ḥ. Like the anusvara, it is a special symbol, and is never followed by an inherent vowel or another vowel.

Consonants

Basic consonant letters
The following tables show the basic consonant letters of the Malayalam script, with romanizations in ISO 15919, transcriptions in IPA, and Unicode . The character names used in the report of the Government of Kerala committee (2001) are shown in lowercase italics when different from Unicode character names. Those alternative names are based on the traditional romanization used by the Malayali people. For example, tha in “Thiruvananthapuram” is neither ISO tha nor Unicode , but tha in this sense. The ISCII (IS 13194:1991) character names are given in parentheses when different from the above.

 The consonants  are true retroflex. As in other Dravidian languages, in Malayalam they are produced by touching the underside of the tongue to the of the hard palate (sub apico-palatal).
 The affricates /, / can either be postalveolar or alveolo-palatal depending upon the speaker and dialect; the postalveolar and alveolo-palatal realizations are in free variation.

Chillus

A chillu, or a chillaksharam (cillakṣaram), is a special consonant letter that represents a pure consonant independently, without help of a virama. Unlike a consonant represented by an ordinary consonant letter, this consonant is never followed by an inherent vowel. Anusvara and visarga fit this definition but are not usually included. ISCII and Unicode 5.0 treat a chillu as a glyph variant of a normal (“base”) consonant letter. In Unicode 5.1 and later, however, chillu letters are treated as independent characters, encoded atomically.

Six independent chillu letters (0D7A..0D7F) had been encoded in Unicode 5.1., three additional chillu letters (0D54..0D56) were encoded with the publication of Unicode 9.0.

Chandrakkala
The virama in Malayalam is called candrakkala (chandrakkala), it has two functions:
As virama: used to suppress the inherent vowel
As samvruthokaram: represent the “half-u” sound [ɯ̽]

As virama
Chandrakkala  (candrakkala) is a diacritic attached to a consonant letter to show that the consonant is not followed by an inherent vowel or any other vowel (for example,  ka →  k). This kind of diacritic is common in Indic scripts, generically called virama in Sanskrit, or halant in Hindi.

Half-u
According to one author, this alternative form is historically more correct, though the simplified form without a vowel sign u is common nowadays. This means that the same spelling  may represent either n or nŭ depending on the context. Generally, it is nŭ at the end of a word, and n elsewhere;  always represents nŭ.

The virama of Tigalari script behave similarly to Malayalam. Virama has three functions: to suppress the inherent vowel (as the halant of Devanagari); to form conjunct consonants; to represent the half-u.

Ligatures

Consonant ligatures
Like in other Indic scripts, a virama is used in the Malayalam script to cancel—or “kill”—the inherent vowel of a consonant letter and represent a consonant without a vowel, so-called a “dead” consonant. For example,
  is a consonant letter na,
  is a virama; therefore,
  (na + virama) represents a dead consonant n.
If this n  is further followed by another consonant letter, for example, ma , the result may look like , which represents nma as na + virama + ma. In this case, two elements n  and ma  are simply placed one by one, side by side. Alternatively, nma can be also written as a ligature .

Generally, when a dead consonant letter C1 and another consonant letter C2 are conjoined, the result may be either:
 A fully conjoined ligature of C1+C2;
 Half-conjoined—
 C1-conjoining: a modified form (half form) of C1 attached to the original form (full form) of C2
 C2-conjoining: a modified form of C2 attached to the full form of C1; or
 Non-ligated: full forms of C1 and C2 with a visible virama.

If the result is fully or half-conjoined, the (conceptual) virama which made C1 dead becomes invisible, only logically existing in a character encoding scheme such as Unicode. If the result is non-ligated, a virama is visible, attached to C1. The glyphs for nma has a visible virama if not ligated, but if ligated, the virama disappears. Usually the difference between those forms is superficial and both are semantically identical, just like the meaning of the English word palaeography does not change even if it is spelled palæography, with the ligature æ.

Common consonant ligatures
Several consonant-consonant ligatures are used commonly even in the new orthography.

The ligature mpa  was historically derived from npa . The ligatures cca, bba, yya, and vva are special in that a doubled consonant is denoted by a triangle sign below a consonant letter.

Consonant + ya, va, la, ra
 The consonant letter ya is generally C2-conjoining after a consonant in both orthographies. For example,
 k  + ya  = kya 
 p  + ya  = pya 

In kya , a variant form of ya is placed after the full form of ka , just like ki  is written ka  followed by the vowel sign i . In other words, the variant form of ya used after a consonant letter can be considered as a diacritic. Since it is placed after the base character, it is sometimes referred to as a post-base form. An exception is yya  (see above).

 Similarly, va after a consonant takes a post-base form:
 k  + va  = kva 
 p  + va  = pva 
An exception is vva  (see above).

 The consonant letter la after a consonant traditionally takes a below-base form. These forms are used also in the new orthography, though some fonts do not support them.
 k  + la  = kla 
 p  + la  = pla 
 l  + la  = lla 

 A consonant letter ra (്ര) after a consonant usually takes a pre-base form in the reformed orthography, while this combination makes a fully conjoined ligature in the traditional orthography.
 k  + ra  = kra 
 p  + ra  = pra

nṯa and ṯṯa
The ligature nṯa is written as n  + ṟa  and pronounced . The ligature ṯṯa is written as ṟ  + ṟa .

In those two ligatures, a small ṟa  is written below the first letter (chillu-n if it is a dead n). Similarly,  is read either ṟaṟa or ṯṯa.

Dot reph
In the traditional orthography, a dead consonant r before a consonant sometimes takes an above-base form, known as a dot reph, which looks like a short vertical line or a dot. Generally, a chillu-r is used instead of a dot reph in the reformed orthography.

r  + ga  = rga 
r  + ja  = rja 

Consonant-vowel ligatures
In the pre-1971 orthography, consonant + the vowels u, ū, r̥ were written as ligatures, post-1971 they are written with symbols after the letter. They can be still seen in old signs and used by people who learned to write before 1971.

Consonant-consonant ligatures

Archaic signs

Archaic viramas
Before chandrakkala was made, there were two other viramas used simultaneously, the vertical bar virama  and circular virama . The vertical bar virama was used exclusively for loanwords and circular virama just for native words. Before the vertical bar virama used to cut through the main consonant and it led to the creation of the chillu letters. It was sometimes confused with the dot reph  since they look similar but both of them are used for different purposes (see above for dot reph).

Chandrabindu
 was like the chandrabindu from other scripts and was used to nasalise the vowel, it was only used for writing Sanskrit and Prakrits. It is archaic.

Other Anusvaras
 was used like the Devanagari  and contrasts with the normal anusvara.  was not really used in Malayalam but was used in the Grantha script, in it the normal anusvara  represents gemination of the next consonant and this anusvara represents an actual linguistic anusvara. Both are archaic.

Numeral System 

Malayalam numeral system is archaic and no longer commonly used. Instead, the common Hindu-Arabic numeral system is followed.

Number "11" is written as "" and not "". "32" is written as "" similar to the Tamil numeral system.

Suppose the number is "2013". It is read in Malayalam as "" (raṇḍāyiratti padimūnnu). It is split into :

  (raṇḍŭ) : 2 - 
  (āyiram) : 1000 - 
  (pattŭ) : 10 - 
  (mūnnŭ) : 3 - 

Combine them together to get the Malayalam number "".

Other symbols

Sample text
The following text is Article 1 of the Universal Declaration of Human Rights.

English
All human beings are born free and equal in dignity and rights. They are endowed with reason and conscience and should act towards one another in a spirit of brotherhood.

Malayalam
.

Romanisation (ISO 15919)
man̠uṣyarellāvaruṁ tulyāvakāśaṅṅaḷōṭuṁ antassōṭuṁ svātantryattōṭuṅkūṭi jan̠icciṭṭuḷḷavarāṇ‌ŭ. an̠yōn̠yaṁ bhrātr̥bhāvattōṭe perumāṟuvān̠āṇ‌ŭ man̠uṣyan̠ŭ vivēkabuddhiyuṁ man̠asākṣiyuṁ siddhamāyirikkunnat‌ŭ.

IPA
/manuʂjaɾellaːʋaɾum t̪uljaːʋaɡaːʃaŋŋaɭoːɖum an̪d̪assoːɖum sʋaːd̪an̪d̪rjat̪t̪oːɖuŋguːɖi d͡ʒanit͡ʃt͡ʃiʈʈuɭɭaʋaɾaːɳɨ̆ ǁ anjoːnjam bʱraːt̪ribʱaːʋat̪t̪oːɖe peɾumaːruʋaːnaːɳɨ̆ manuʂjanɨ̆ ʋiʋeːɡabud̪d̪ʱijum manasaːkʂijum sid̪d̪ʱamaːjiɾikkun̪n̪ad̪ɨ̆ ǁ/

Unicode

Malayalam script was added to the Unicode Standard in October, 1991 with the release of version 1.0.

Block

The Unicode block for Malayalam is U+0D00–U+0D7F:

Chillus in Unicode
For example, avan  (“he”) is written as a  + va  + chillu-n , where chillu-n represents the n sound without a vowel. In other Indic scripts, the same word would be possibly written as a + va + na + virama. However, in Malayalam script, that sequence represents a different word, avanŭ  (“to him”), and is not interchangeable with avan. This is because in modern Malayalam script, the sign for a virama also works as the sign for a vowel ŭ at the end of a word, and is not able to cleanly “kill” the inherent vowel in this case.

To differentiate a pure consonant (chillu) and a consonant with ŭ, zero-width joiner (ZWJ) and zero-width non-joiner (ZWNJ) were used before Unicode 5.1. However, this system was problematic. Among other things, glyph variants specified by ZWJ or ZWNJ are supposed to be non-semantic, whereas a chillu (expressed as letter + virama + ZWJ) and the same consonant followed by a ŭ (expressed as letter + virama + ZWNJ) are often semantically different. After a long debate, Nine chillu letters now have their own code points since Unicode 9.0 (though only 5 of them are used in modern Malayalam), though applications should also be prepared to handle data in the representation specified in Unicode 5.0. This means, fonts should display chillus in both sequences; while an input method should output standard chillus.

The ligature nṯa  is very common and supported by most Malayalam fonts in one way or another, but exactly how it should be encoded was not clear in Unicode 5.0 and earlier, and two incompatible implementations are currently in use. In Unicode 5.1 (2008), the sequence to represent it was explicitly redefined as chillu-n + virama + ṟa.  ligature is often considered to be the correct form to represent n̠d̠ as  can also represent n̠r̠ but in many computers it is only shown with  +  +  even though a chandrakkala cannot be after a chillu letter, other computers show it with  +  + .

See also
 
 Arabi Malayalam script
 Coorgi–Cox alphabet
 Tigalari script
 Malabar script
 Malayalam Braille
 Mulabhadra
 Suriyani Malayalam
Grantha script
Sinhala script
ISO 15919

References

Sources
 
 Burnell, Arthur Coke (1874). Elements of South-Indian Palæography from the Fourth to the Seventeenth Century A.D. Trübner & Co.

Further reading

External links

 Website to help you read and write the Malayalam alphabet
 Malayalam Unicode Fonts

 
Brahmic scripts
Script, Malayalam
Officially used writing systems of India